Thamsanqa Aubrey Gabuza (born 27 July 1987) is a South African soccer player who plays as a striker for SuperSport United in South Africa and Bafana Bafana.

International career

International goals
Scores and results list South Africa's goal tally first.

References 

1987 births
Living people
People from Ladysmith, KwaZulu-Natal
South African soccer players
South Africa international soccer players
Association football forwards
Durban Stars F.C. players
Lamontville Golden Arrows F.C. players
Orlando Pirates F.C. players
SuperSport United F.C. players
South African Premier Division players